Henriëtte Vaillant (10 December 1875 – 13 December 1949) was a Dutch sculptor. Her work was part of the sculpture event in the art competition at the 1928 Summer Olympics.

References

1875 births
1949 deaths
20th-century Dutch sculptors
Dutch women sculptors
Olympic competitors in art competitions
Artists from Utrecht
20th-century Dutch women artists